I Am Nazzy is a 2022 Nollywood debutant movie of Chinonso Arubayi and directed by Kayode Peters under the production company of Arubayi’s Film City Studios and Blue Pictures Entertainment.

The swap identity movie stars Jidekene Achufusi, Jimmy Odukoya, Denrele Edun, IK Ogbonna, and Ada Jesus and others.

Plot 
I am Nazzy is a movie that emphasizes contentment. It shows that not all smiles means happiness. In the film, superstar Nazzy wanted to move away from her celebrity life. A life full of pretence and scandal. Her boyfriend who supposed to make her happy prefer social media likes that her attention. She met a therapist who advised her to move away from the life full of glitz and glamour. Fortunately, she met her look alike and decide to change life style with her. The movie left the viewers in suspense on how will the duo deal with their relationship and career

Premiere 
The movie was released on the April 1, 2022 and it was premiered at EbonyLife Cinemas on Sunday 27 March 2022 with eminent personalities gracing the event. Among them are; Bolanle Ninalowo, Stan Eze and Blessing Nze, Elozonam, Denrele Edun, Nons Miraj, Tomi Odunsi, Simi Drey and many more

Cast 
Jide Kene Achufusi, Chinonso Arubayi, Denrele Edun, Kaycee George, Ada Jesus, Chioma Nwosu, Jimmy Odukoya, Ik Ogbonna, Onyebuchi Ojieh, Blessing Onwukwe, Jay Rammal.

References

External links 
 

Nigerian romantic comedy films
2022 films
English-language Nigerian films